Bardu Church is a parish church of the Church of Norway in Bardu Municipality in Troms og Finnmark county, Norway. It is located in the village of Setermoen. It is the main church for the Bardu parish which is part of the Senja prosti (deanery) in the Diocese of Nord-Hålogaland. The white, octagonal, wooden church was built in a octagonal style in 1829 using plans drawn up by the architect Ole Olsen Lundberg. The church seats about 220 people.

Bardu Church was constructed from 1825-1829 and it was modeled after the Tynset Church in Hedmark county, but this one was built to a smaller scale. The church has an octagonal floor plan, a large square tower to the west, and a choir to the east. The exterior of the church is clad with vertical, white painted panels. The tower, which was not completed until 1840, has a pyramid-shaped roof.

Media gallery

See also
List of churches in Nord-Hålogaland
Octagonal churches in Norway

References

Bardu
Churches in Troms
Millennium sites
Octagonal churches in Norway
Wooden churches in Norway
19th-century Church of Norway church buildings
Churches completed in 1829
1829 establishments in Norway